Marat Rafitovich Shaymordanov (born 14 April 1992) is a Russian professional football player. He plays for FC Chelyabinsk.

Club career
He made his Russian Football National League debut for FC Shinnik Yaroslavl on 8 July 2017 in a game against FC Zenit-2 Saint Petersburg.

External links
 Career summary by sportbox.ru  
 

1992 births
Sportspeople from Chelyabinsk
Living people
Russian footballers
Association football midfielders
FC Tyumen players
FC Shinnik Yaroslavl players
FC Chayka Peschanokopskoye players